"Put Down That Weapon" is a song by Australian rock bands Midnight Oil. The song was released in December 1987 as the third single from their sixth studio album, Diesel and Dust.

Track listing
Australian release
 "Put Down That Weapon" (Hirst, Moginie, Garrett, Rotsey, Gifford) - 4:38
 "(What's So Funny 'Bout) Peace, Love, and Understanding" (Nick Lowe) -

 European release
 "Put Down That Weapon"  (Hirst, Moginie, Garrett, Rotsey, Gifford) - 4:38
 "Dreamworld"  (Hirst, Moginie, Garrett, Rotsey, Gifford) - 3:36
 "Short Memory"  (Hirst, Moginie, Garrett, Rotsey, Gifford) - 4:54

Charts

References

Midnight Oil songs
1987 singles
Songs about nuclear war and weapons
1987 songs
Songs written by Rob Hirst
Songs written by Jim Moginie
Songs written by Peter Garrett
Columbia Records singles